The First Unitarian Church of Detroit was located at 2870 Woodward Avenue in Midtown Detroit, Michigan. Built between 1889 and 1890, it was listed on the National Register of Historic Places in 1982. It was destroyed by fire on May 10, 2014.

History

The First Congregational Unitarian Society was incorporated on October 6, 1850. This church, their second, was dedicated in November 1890. The congregation used the church until 1931, when the widening of Woodward Avenue required a remodeling of the church. At that time, they worshiped with the First Universalist Church of Our Father, whose sanctuary on Cass Avenue had been built in 1916. This arrangement worked out so well that the two congregations merged in 1934 to form the Church of Our Father (Unitarian-Universalist), which later became the First Unitarian Universalist Church of Detroit. The First Unitarian building was then sold in 1937 to the Church of Christ denomination. The building went through other owners before finally being abandoned during the 2000s. It sat empty and in poor condition until destroyed by fire in 2014.

Architecture

Designed by the architectural firm of Donaldson and Meier, the First Unitarian Church of Detroit was a Romanesque Revival-style church built of red sandstone. After its remodeling during the 1936 widening of Woodward, it remained substantially as built. The gabled façade had a great expanse of masonry; a simple four-bay porch with a shed roof and stone Romanesque columns spanning the first floor. There was a two-story hip-roofed projection at the corner, and a side porch with stone piers covering a side entrance.

Most of the original John La Farge stained glass windows that faced Woodward Avenue survive in the collection of the Detroit Institute of Arts, which acquired the work in 1959.

References

Further reading
Arson Questions

External links

Detroit Blog: Pictures of the First Unitarian Church of Detroit
Detroiturbex.com: Photo gallery and history

Churches on the National Register of Historic Places in Michigan
Churches completed in 1889
19th-century Unitarian Universalist church buildings
Romanesque Revival church buildings in Michigan
Churches in Detroit
2014 fires in the United States
Demolished buildings and structures in Detroit
Religious organizations established in 1850
1850 establishments in Michigan
National Register of Historic Places in Detroit
Buildings and structures demolished in 2014